Mateo Sabioni (born 2 July 2001) is a Croatian water polo player. He is currently playing for VK Solaris. He is 6 ft 3 in (1.90 m) tall and weighs 192 lb (87 kg).

References

2001 births
Living people
Croatian male water polo players